Khakurdaha is a village and a gram panchayat within the jurisdiction of the Jaynagar police station in the Jaynagar I CD block in the Baruipur subdivision of the South 24 Parganas district in the Indian state of West Bengal.

Geography

Demographics
As per 2011 Census of India, Khakurdaha had a total population of 3,542.

Transport
A short stretch of local roads link Khakurdaha to the State Highway 1.

Gocharan railway station is located nearby.

Healthcare
Padmerhat Rural Hospital, with 30 beds, at Padmerhat, is the major government medical facility in the Jaynagar I CD block.

References

Villages in South 24 Parganas district
Neighbourhoods in Jaynagar Majilpur